The men's college basketball program of the Drexel University was founded in 1894 and is known competitively as the Drexel Dragons. The team has had 26 head coaches in its history, and they have made 4 appearances in the NCAA Men's Division I Basketball Championship, including a first round victory in 1996.  Sam Cozen won 213 career games as head coach between 1952 and 1968, the second most in the school's history behind Bruiser Flint.

In 2013, Bruiser Flint won his 214th regular season game as the Dragon's head coach, achieving in the program's history the distinction of its winningest head coach.

Coaches

Statistics updated through 2020–21 season

Notes

References

Drexel

Drexel Dragons basketball, men's, coaches